Arun Kumar Sinha is an Indian politician and a Member of the Bharatiya Janata Party from Bihar. Sinha has won the Bihar Legislative Assembly election in 2005, 2010, 2015 and in 2020 from Kumhrar Assembly constituency.

References 

Living people
1951 births
Bihar MLAs 2020–2025
Bihar MLAs 2015–2020
Bihar MLAs 2010–2015
Bihar MLAs 2005–2010
Bharatiya Janata Party politicians from Bihar